Bilgesu Aydın (born June 8, 1994) is a Turkish women's football goalkeeper currently playing in the Turkish Women's First Football League for Konak Belediyespor in İzmir with jersey number 88. She is member of the Turkey women's national team.

Bilgesu Aydın was born in Denizli on June 8, 1994. She studied physical education and sports at Ege University in Izmir.

Playing career
She began football playing encouraged by her mother, who took her to the local football club in Izmir, where the family moved to, and registered her. She bought her goalkeeper glove and shoes knowing that her daughter wanted to be a goalkeeper.

Club

Aydın received her license for Bucaspor on May 29, 2009. She played two seasons for the team, capping 19 times during this time. In the 2011–12 season, she transferred to the Ankara-based Gazi Üniversitesispor, where she played one season and appeared in 16 games. On October 22, 2012, Bilgesu Aydın signed for Ataşehir Belediyespor in Istanbul. In the beginning of the second half of the 2015–16 season, she was transferred by the İzmir-based club Konak Belediyespor.At the end of the season, she enjoyed her team's champion title. She debuted and played at the Group 9 of the 2016–17 UEFA Women's Champions League qualifying round.

International
In December 2011, she was called up to the Turkey women's U-19 national team, and debuted in the friendly match against the Russian junior women on February 18, 2012. She took part in three matches of the 2013 UEFA Women's U-19 Championship First qualifying round – Group 5. Aydın capped 7 times for the nationals so far.

Aydın debuted in the Turkey women's national team playing in the 2017 Goldcity Women's Cup against Kosovo.

Career statistics
.

Honours
 Turkish Women's First League
 Ataşehir Belediyespor
 Runners-up (3): 2012–13, 2013–14, 2014–15

 Konak Belediyespor
 Winners (2): 2015–16, 2016–17
 Third places (2): 2017–18, 2018–19

References 

Living people
1994 births
Sportspeople from Denizli
Ege University alumni
Women's association football goalkeepers
Turkish women's footballers
Turkey women's international footballers
Bucaspor women's players
Gazi Üniversitesispor players
Ataşehir Belediyespor players
Konak Belediyespor players